The electroglottograph, or EGG, (also referred to as a laryngograph) is a device used for the noninvasive measurement of the degree of contact between the vibrating vocal folds during voice production. Though it is difficult to verify the assumption precisely, the aspect of contact being measured by a typical EGG unit is considered to be the vocal fold contact area (VFCA). To measure VFCA, electrodes are applied on the surface of the neck so that the EGG records variations in the transverse electrical impedance of the larynx and nearby tissues by means of a small A/C electric current (in megaHertz). This electrical impedance will vary slightly with the area of contact between the moist vocal folds during the segment of the glottal vibratory cycle in which the folds are in contact. However, because the percentage variation in the neck impedance caused by vocal fold contact can be extremely small and varies considerably between subjects, no absolute measure of contact area is obtained, only the pattern of variation for a given subject.

Early commercial available EGG units were compared quite thoroughly by Baken.  However, using modern low noise electronics, EGG noise levels can be brought down enough so that the noise is approximately 40 dB, a factor of 100 less than a typical EGG signal from an adult voice.

In addition, by using multiple channels simultaneously, the technique can be made easier to use and more reliable by giving the user an indication of the correct positioning of the electrodes, and providing a quantitative measure of vertical movements of the larynx during voice production.

Electroglottograph signals have also been used in stroboscope synchronization, voice fundamental frequency tracking, tracking vocal fold abductory movements and the study of the singing voice.

Electroglottographic wavegrams are a new technique for displaying and analyzing EGG signals. This technique provides an intuitive means for quickly assessing vocal fold contact phenomena and their variation over time.

References

External links
Glottal Enterprises EG2-PCX
Laryngograph Electro-Laryngograph
VoceVista Electroglottograph

Voice technology
Human voice
Impedance measurements